In Pennsylvania, the courts of common pleas are the trial courts of the Unified Judicial System of Pennsylvania (the state court system).

The courts of common pleas are the trial courts of general jurisdiction in the state. The name derives from the medieval English court of Common Pleas. Pennsylvania established them in 1722.

They hear civil cases with a significant amount in controversy and trials for serious crimes. They have original jurisdiction over all cases not exclusively assigned to another court and appellate jurisdiction over judgments from the minor courts (which include the magisterial district courts in all counties but Philadelphia, the Philadelphia Municipal Court and Pittsburgh Municipal Court). They also hear appeals from certain state and most local government agencies.
The courts are established by Article V, Section 5 of the Pennsylvania Constitution: 

The courts of common pleas are organized into 60 judicial districts, 53 comprising one of Pennsylvania's 67 counties, and seven comprising two counties. 

Each district has from one to 101 judges. Judges of the common pleas courts are elected to ten-year terms. A president judge and a court administrator serve in each judicial district. In districts with seven or fewer judges, the president judge with the longest continuous service holds this position. In districts with eight or more judges, the president judge is elected to a five-year term by the court.

Judicial districts

See also
List of state and county courthouses in Pennsylvania

Notes and references

External links
Courts of Common Pleas – information from the Unified Judicial System of Pennsylvania
Pennsylvania state courts
Courts and tribunals with year of establishment missing